This is a list of prisons within Shaanxi province of the People's Republic of China.

Sources 

Buildings and structures in Shaanxi
Shaanxi